Laurent Garnier (born 1 February 1966), also known as Choice, is a French electronic music producer and DJ. Garnier began DJing in Manchester during the late 1980s. He became a producer in the early 1990s and recorded several albums.

Early influences
In 1984, Garnier started working as a waiter for the French Embassy in London. He started to play with DJ Nelson a.k.a. DJ Stan in French club. He stayed there for a year and a half before moving to Manchester in 1986. Living in England he discovered the booming UK house scene and started DJing, including at the Haçienda.

Career
In 1987, he discovered The Haçienda in Manchester, and met Mike Pickering the resident DJ. Chicago house and Detroit techno became popular, and Garnier started mixing there under the name of DJ Pedro.

In 1988, he went back to France to fulfill his military obligations. He also spent some time in New York City where he met Frankie Knuckles. Garnier shifted his attention back to France in the early 1990s, running the Wake Up parties at the Rex Club in Paris for three years, and in Dijon from 1990 to 1994 at L'An-Fer while in 1992 he played a three-night long Weekender set at the Cork venue, Sir Henry's. He also mixed in clubs such as Le Palace or Le Boy, DJing in rave parties and gradually moving into recording as well. For the FNAC label, Garnier released "French Connection" and the A Bout de Souffle EP. After that label went out of business, he formed the F Communications label with Eric Morand (a friend who had also worked for Fnac).

His first album, Shot in the Dark, was released in 1995. His second, 30, appeared in 1997 and included one of Garnier's best selling singles, "Crispy Bacon". 30 was followed by the retrospective Early Works. After appearing worldwide with DJ appearances during the late 1990s, Garnier returned to production with Unreasonable Behaviour, released in early 2000, which featured one of his best known songs, "The Man with the Red Face".

Selected discography

Charted albums

Charted singles

Albums
 Shot in the Dark (1994), F Communications
 Raw Works (US only compilation) (1996), Never Recordings
 30 (1997), F Communications/PIAS France
 Unreasonable Behaviour (2000), F Communications
 Early Works (compilation) (1998), Arcade
 The Cloud Making Machine (2005), F Communications/PIAS
 Retrospective 1994 – 2006 (compilation) (2006), F Communications/PIAS (with Håkon Kornstad)
 Public Outburst (live album) (2007)
 Tales of a Kleptomaniac (2009), PIAS
 HOME box (2015), F Communications
 De Película (2021), with  The Limiñanas, Because Music

Singles and EPs

With Ed Banger records
 "Timeless EP" −2012

With FNAC Music Dance Division
 "French Connection" (with Mix Master Doody) – 'as French Connection' (1991)
 Stronger By Design EP (1992)
 "Join Hands" (remixes) – (1992)
 Paris EP – 1993 – as 'Choice' (also published by Fragile Records)
 A Bout de Souffle EP – (1993) (also published by Warp Records)
 "For House Music Lovers" – 1993
 "Lost in Alaska" – 'as Alaska' – 1993
 Planet House EP – 1993

With F Communications
 Dune (with Pascal Feos) – Alliance EP – 1994
 "Astral Dreams" – 1994
 Alaska – Deuxième EP – 1995
 Club Traxx EP – 1995
 "The Hoe" – 1996
 "Crispy Bacon Part 1" – 1997 – UK No. 60
 "Crispy Bacon Part 2" - 1997
 "Flashback" - 1997
 "Coloured City" - 1998
 Club Traxx EP Vol 2 - 1998
 "The Sound of the Big Babou" - 1999
 "The Man with the Red Face" - 2000 - UK No. 65
 "Greed" / "The Man with the Red Face" – 2000 – UK No. 36
 "Sambou" – 2002
 "Returning Back to Sirius" – 'as Alaska' – 2003
 Marl Chingus (with Ludovic Llorca) – "6 Months Earlier" – 2004
 "The Cloud Making Machine" (reworks vol 1 & 2) – 2005

With Innervisions
 Back to My Roots EP – 2008

DVDs
 Greed – DVD single – F Communications, Film Office, TDK Mediactive – 2001
 Live à l'Elysée Montmartre – F communications – 2002

Compilations and DJ sessions
 X-Mix – Destination Planet Dream (Studio !K7 – 1994)
 Mixmag Live Vol. 19 (1995)
 Laboratoire Mix (2xCD, React, 1996)
 Early Works (2xCD, 1998)
 Fashion TV: Spring – Summer 2001 Collection
 Classic And Rare : La Collection Chapter 3 (F Communications, 2002)
 Excess Luggage (3xCD, F Communications, 2003)
 The Kings of Techno (Rapster Records, 2006)
 Mixmag 25 Years Anniversary  (2008)

References

External links
 Laurent Garnier – official site
 Laurent Garnier discography at Discogs
 Laurent Garnier profile at club The End's website
 Laurent Garnier interview on HarderFaster
 Laurent Garnier biography from RFI Musique (in French)
 Laurent Garnier Essential Mix 2009
 Laurent Garnier DJ mix

1966 births
Living people
Mute Records artists
French DJs
Audiogram (label) artists
Thirsty Ear Recordings artists
French house musicians